is a 1998 Japanese film written and directed by Kensaku Watanabe and starring Sakura Uehara and Reiko Matsuo. The story follows two anarchistic girls on a road trip to visit the grave of a piglet named PuPu. It is Watanabe's directorial debut. Cult film director Seijun Suzuki appears in a small role.

Cast
 Sakura Uehara as Suzu
 Jun Kunimura as Kijima
 Tatsushi Omori as Gesuo
 Reiko Matsuo as Fu
 Yoshio Harada as Joji
 Seijun Suzuki as the old man
 Rei Yamanaka as Trunk Man
 Mitsuaki Tuda as Iruka
 Daizo Sakurai as the golfer

References

External links
 
 
 The Story of PuPu  at the Japanese Movie Database
 Official website 

1998 films
1990s Japanese-language films
1998 comedy films
Japanese comedy films
Japanese road movies
1990s comedy road movies
1998 directorial debut films
1990s Japanese films